Deborah Goodrich Royce (née Goodrich; May 11, 1958) is an American former actress, story editor, and author. She is best known for her screen roles in Just One of the Guys (1985) and the horror films April Fool's Day (1986) and Remote Control (1988).

Goodrich published her debut novel, Finding Mrs. Ford, through the Post Hill Press, an imprint of Simon & Schuster, in 2019.

Biography 
Goodrich was raised in Warren, Michigan. She graduated summa cum laude from Lake Erie College in Painesville, Ohio in 1980, earning a bachelor's degree in modern foreign languages with a minor in dance.
Goodrich started acting in 1980 with the film Those Lips, Those Eyes. Thereafter she played several roles in television series and films such as All My Children (1982–1983) and St. Elsewhere (1986). She stopped acting in 1992 to dedicate herself to her work as a story editor with Miramax.

Goodrich is on the boards of the New York Botanical Garden, the PRASAD Project, the Avon Theatre in Stamford, Connecticut (which she co-founded), and the Greenwich Historical Society. She is on the advisory boards of the American Film Institute, the Greenwich International Film Festival, the Preservation Society of Newport County, and the Preservation Foundation of Palm Beach.

In 2014, she joined the board of the Greenwich International Film Festival.

Her first novel, Finding Mrs. Ford, a literary thriller, will be published on June 25, 2019 by Post Hill Press and distributed by Simon & Schuster.

Personal life
Goodrich is married to Charles Royce. She has two daughters, Alexandra and Tess, with her former husband, Pliny Porter. She was Julia Roberts' bridesmaid. As of 2019, Goodrich resides in Riverside, Connecticut, where she has been a long-time resident.

Filmography

Film

Television

Bibliography

References

External links 
 
 

1958 births
Actresses from Detroit
Actresses from Michigan
Actresses from New York (state)
American film actresses
American television actresses
American thriller writers
American women novelists
Lake Erie College alumni
Living people
Novelists from New York (state)
People from Mamaroneck, New York
People from Warren, Michigan
Women thriller writers
20th-century American actresses
21st-century American novelists
21st-century American women writers